The 1998 Bavarian Cup was the first edition of this competition. It ended with the SV Schalding-Heining winning the competition. Together with the finalist, SG Post/Süd Regensburg, both clubs were qualified for the DFB Cup 1998-99. 

The competition is open to all senior men's football teams playing within the Bavarian football league system and the Bavarian clubs in the Regionalliga Süd (III).

Rules & History
The seven Bezirke in Bavaria each play their own cup competition which in turn used to function as a qualifying to the German Cup (DFB-Pokal). Since 1998 these seven cup-winners plus the losing finalist of the region that won the previous event advance to the newly introduced Bavarian Cup, the Toto-Pokal. The two finalists of this competition advance to the German Cup. Bavarian clubs which play in the first or second Bundesliga are not permitted to take part in the event, their reserve teams however can. The seven regional cup winners were qualified for the first round.

Participating clubs
The following seven clubs qualified for the 1999 Bavarian Cup:

Bavarian Cup season 1998-99 
Teams qualified for the next round in bold.

Regional finals

 1 Until the end of the 1997-98 season, a rule of the Schwaben FA stipulated that, in case of a draw after extra time, the lower classed team advances. A penalty shoot-out only applied if both teams played on the same league level. The rule was changed after 1998.

First round

Semi-finals

Final

DFB Cup 1998-99
The two clubs, SV Schalding-Heining and SG Post/Süd Regensburg, who qualified through the Bavarian Cup for the DFB Cup 1998-99 both were knocked out in the first round of the national cup competition:

References

External links
 Bavarian FA website  

1998
Bavarian